This is a chronological list of oratorios from the 16th century to the present. Unless otherwise indicated, all dates are those when the work was first performed. In some cases only the date of composition is known. In others, the oratorio has only been performed on a recording.

There is considerable overlap between the oratorio and the cantata, especially during the 19th century. The works listed below are those that have most often been referred to as oratorios.

16th century
Emilio de' Cavalieri – Rappresentatione di Anima, et di Corpo (1600)

17th century

Pietro della Valle – Oratorio della Purificatione (1640, the earliest documented use of the word "oratorio" to describe a musical composition)
Cornelis Thymenszoon Padbrué – De tranen Petri ende Pauli  (published 1647, only partial score survives)
Giacomo Carissimi – Jephte (before 16 June 1648)
Giacomo Carissimi – Baltazar (mid-17th century)
Giacomo Carissimi – Diluvium universale (mid-17th century)
Giacomo Carissimi – Dives malus (mid-17th century)
Giacomo Carissimi – Ezechias (mid-17th century)
Giacomo Carissimi – Jonas (mid-17th century)
Giacomo Carissimi – Abramo e Isacco (mid-17th century)
Giacomo Carissimi – Job (mid-17th century)
Giacomo Carissimi – Judicium extremum (mid-17th century)
Giacomo Carissimi – Judicium Salomonis (before 1669)
Marc-Antoine Charpentier – Judith sive liberata H.391 (mid 1670s)
Marc-Antoine Charpentier – Canticum pro pace H.392 (mid 1670s)
Marc-Antoine Charpentier – Canticum in nativitatem Domini H.393 (mid 1670s)
Marc-Antoine Charpentier – In honorem Caecilliae, Valeriani et Tiburij canticum H.394 (mid 1670s)
Marc-Antoine Charpentier – Pour la fête de l'Epiphanie H.395 (mid 1670s)
Marc-Antoine Charpentier – Historia Esther H.396 (mid 1670s)
Marc-Antoine Charpentier – Cacillia virgo et martyr Octobre vocibus H.397 (mid 1670s)
Marc-Antoine Charpentier – Pestis Mediolanensis H.398 (mid 1670s)
Marc-Antoine Charpentier – Prélude pour Horrenda pastis H.398 a (1679)
Marc-Antoine Charpentier – Filius prodigus H.399 (1680)
Marc-Antoine Charpentier – Prélude pour l'enfant prodigue H.399 a (1681–82)
Marc-Antoine Charpentier – L'enfant prodigue H/399 b (date unknown)
Marc-Antoine Charpentier – L'enfant prodigue H.399 c (date unknown)
Marc-Antoine Charpentier – Canticum in honorem Beatae Virginis Mariae... H.400 (1680)
Marc-Antoine Charpentier – Extremum Dei judicium H.401 (early 1680s)
Marc-Antoine Charpentier – Sacrificium Abrahae H.402
Marc-Antoine Charpentier – Symphonies ajustées au sacrifice d'Abraham H.402 a (date unknown)
Marc-Antoine Charpentier – Le sacrifice d'Abraham H.402 b (date unknown)
Marc-Antoine Charpentier – Mors Saülis et Jonathae H.403 (early 1680s)
Marc-Antoine Charpentier – Josue prélude H.404 a (1679)
Marc-Antoine Charpentier – Josue H.404 (early 1680s)
Marc-Antoine Charpentier – In resurrectione Domini Nostri Jesu Christi H.405 (1681–82)
Marc-Antoine Charpentier – In circumcisione Domini / Dialogus inter angelum et pastores H.406 (1682–83)
Marc-Antoine Charpentier – Dialogus inter esurientem, sitientem et Christum H.407 (1682–83)
Marc-Antoine Charpentier – Elévation H.408 (1683)
Marc-Antoine Charpentier – In obitum augustissimae nec non piissime Gallorum regina lamentum H.409 (1683)
Marc-Antoine Charpentier – Praelium Michaelis Archangeli factum in cocho cum dracone H.410 (1683)
Marc-Antoine Charpentier – Caedes sanctorum innocentium H.411 (1683–85)
Marc-Antoine Charpentier – Nuptiae sacrae H.412 (1683–85)
Marc-Antoine Charpentier – Caecilia virgo et martyr H.413 (1683–85)
Marc-Antoine Charpentier – In nativitatem Domini Nostri Jesu Christi canticum H.414 (1683–85)
Marc-Antoine Charpentier – Caecilia virgo et martyr H.415 (1686)
Marc-Antoine Charpentier – Prologue de la Ste Cécile après l'ouverture : Harmonia coelistis H.415 a (1686–87)
Marc-Antoine Charpentier – In nativitatem Domini canticum H.416 (late 1680s)
Marc-Antoine Charpentier – Dialogus inter Christum et homines H.417 (early 1690s)
Marc-Antoine Charpentier – In honorem Sancti Ludovici regis Galliae H.418 (early 1690s)
Marc-Antoine Charpentier – Pour Saint Augustin mourant H.419 (late 1690s)
Marc-Antoine Charpentier – Dialogus inter angelos et pastores Judae in nativitatem Domini H.420 (late 1690s)
Marc-Antoine Charpentier – In nativitatem Domini Nostri Jesu Christi canticum H.421 (1698–99)
Marc-Antoine Charpentier – Judicium Salomonis H.422 & H.422 a (1702)
Marc-Antoine Charpentier – Dialogus inter Magdalena et Jesu 2 vocibus Canto e Alto cum organo H.423 (date unknown)
Marc-Antoine Charpentier – Le reniement de St Pierre H.424 (date unknown)
Marc-Antoine Charpentier – Dialogus inter Christum et peccatores H.425 & H.425 a date unknown)
Louis-Nicolas Clérambault - L'histoire de la femme adultère ( 1699 ?) C.191 
Sébastien de Brossard - Dialogus poenitentis animae cum Deo (1699 ?) SdB.55

18th century

Sébastien de Brossard - Oratorio sopra l'immaculata conceptione della B Virgine (1702 - 1713) SdB.56
George Frideric Handel  – Il trionfo del Tempo e del Disinganno (1707)
George Frideric Handel  – La resurrezione (1708)
Francesco Maria Veracini – Il trionfo della innocenza da S Niccolò (?1712)
George Frideric Handel  – Brockes Passion (1715)
Francesco Maria Veracini – Mosè al mar rosso, ovvero Il naufragio di Faraone (?1715; revised as La liberazione del popolo ebreo nel naufragio di Faraone, 1723)
Antonio Vivaldi – Juditha triumphans (1716)
Francesco Maria Veracini – L'incoronazione di Davidde (1717) 
Francesco Maria Veracini – La caduta del savio nell’idoltria di Salomone (1720)
Jan Dismas Zelenka – Sub olea pacis et palma virtutis (1723)
Johann Sebastian Bach – St John Passion (1724)
Johann David Heinichen – L'aride tempie ignude, passion oratorio (1724?)
Francesco Maria Veracini – L'empietà distrutta nella caduta di Gerico (1724)
Johann Sebastian Bach – Easter Oratorio  (1725)
Johann Sebastian Bach – St Matthew Passion (1727)
Johann David Heinichen – Come? S'imbruna il cieli Occhi piangete (1728), passion oratorio (1724?)
Jan Dismas Zelenka – Il Serpente di Bronzo (1730)
Willem de Fesch – Judith (1732)
Maurice Greene – The Song of Deborah and Barak (1732)
George Frideric Handel  – Esther (1732)
George Frideric Handel  – Athalia (1733)
George Frideric Handel  – Deborah (1733)
Johann Adolph Hasse – Il cantico de' tre fanciulli (1734)
Johann Sebastian Bach  – Christmas Oratorio (1734)
Johann Sebastian Bach  – Ascension Oratorio (1735)
Johann Georg Reutter – Gioas re di Giuda (1735)
William Boyce – David’s Lamentation over Saul and Jonathan (1736)
George Frideric Handel  – Alexander's Feast (1736)
Jan Dismas Zelenka – I penitenti al sepolcro del redentore (1736)
Maurice Greene  – Jephtha (1737)
George Frideric Handel  – Il trionfo del Tempo e della Verità (1737)
Johann Adolph Hasse – Le virtù appiè della croce  (1737)
George Frideric Handel  – Israel in Egypt (1738)
George Frideric Handel  – Saul (1739)
Giuseppe Bonno – Eleazaro (1739)
Giuseppe Bonno – San Paolo in Athene (1740)
George Frideric Handel  – L'Allegro, il Penseroso ed il Moderato (1740)
Johann Adolph Hasse – Serpentes ignei in deserto (1740)
John Christopher Smith – David's Lamentation over Saul and Jonathan (Hickman's Rooms, 1740)
George Frideric Handel  – Messiah (1741)
George Frideric Handel  – Samson (1741)
Johann Adolph Hasse – Giuseppe riconosciuto (1741)
Johann Adolph Hasse – I pellegrini al sepolcro di Nostro Signore (1742)
George Frideric Handel  – Joseph and his Brethren (1743)
George Frideric Handel  – Semele (1743)
Thomas Arne – The Death of Abel (1744, lost except for 'Hymn of Eve')
Thomas Arne – Judith (1744)
Maurice Greene  – The Force of Truth (1744)
George Frideric Handel  – Hercules (1744)
Johann Adolph Hasse – Ci'l un parantê und parsol scelopgrini (1744)
Francesco Maria Veracini – L'errore di Salomone (1744)
Thomas Arne – Alfred (1745, oratorio version, later an opera)
George Frideric Handel  – Belshazzar (1745)
Johann Adolph Hasse –  La Caduta di Gerico (1745)
Willem de Fesch – Joseph (1746)
George Frideric Handel  – Judas Maccabaeus (1746)
George Frideric Handel  – Occasional Oratorio (1746)
George Frideric Handel  – Joshua (1747)
Johann Adolph Hasse –  Santa Elena al Calvario (1747)
Franz Xaver Richter –  La Deposizione della Croce (1748)
George Frideric Handel  – Alexander Balus (1748)
George Frideric Handel  – Solomon (1748)
George Frideric Handel  – Susanna (1748) 
George Frideric Handel  – Theodora (1749)
George Frideric Handel  – The Choice of Hercules (1750)
Jean-Joseph de Mondonville - Coeli enarrant gloria (1750)
Johann Adolph Hasse –  La conversione di Sant' Agostino  (1750)
George Frideric Handel  – Jephtha (1752)
Carl Heinrich Graun – Der Tod Jesu (1755)
George Frideric Handel  – The Triumph of Time and Truth (1757)
John Stanley – Jephthah (1757)
Johann Adolph Hasse – S. Petrus et S. Maria Magdalena (1759)
Giuseppe Bonno – Isacco figura del redentore (1759)
John Christopher Smith – Paradise Lost (1760)
John Stanley – Zimiri (1760)
Thomas Arne – Judith (1761)
John Christopher Smith – Rebecca (1761, reworking of music by Handel)
John Stanley – Arcadia (1762)
Georg Philipp Telemann – Der Tag des Gerichts (1762)
Johann Georg Albrechtsberger – La passione di Gesù Cristo (1762)
George Frideric Handel  – Nabal (1764)
John Christopher Smith – Tobit (1764, reworking of music by Handel)
John Worgan and Christopher Smart – Hannah (1764)
Carl Ditters von Dittersdorf – Isacco figura del Redentore (1766)
Wolfgang Amadeus Mozart  – Die Schuldigkeit des ersten Gebots (1767, only the first part)
Francesco Maria Veracini – L'Assalone, ovvero L'infedelta punita (before 1768)
Samuel Arnold  – Abimelech (1768)
Michael Haydn – Der Kampf der Busse und Bekehrung (1768)
Michael Haydn – Kaiser Constanstin I. Feldzug und Sieg (1769)
George Frideric Handel  – Gideon (1769)
Carl Philipp Emanuel Bach – Die Israeliten in der Wüste (1769)
Carl Ditters von Dittersdorf – Davide penitente (1770)
Michael Haydn – Der reumütige Petrus (1770)
Michael Haydn – Der büssende Sünder (1771)
Josef Mysliveček – Adamo ed Eva (1771)
Florian Leopold Gassmann – La Betulia Liberata (1772)
Samuel Arnold – The Prodigal Son (1773)
Luffman Atterbury – Goliah (5 May 1773, Haymarket Theatre, London)
Charles Avison (in collaboration with Felice Giardini) – Ruth (1773)
Carl Ditters von Dittersdorf – La Liberatrice del Popolo Giudaico nella Persia, o sia l’Esther (1773)
Giuseppe Bonno – Il Giuseppe riconosciuto (1774)
John Stanley – The Fall of Egypt (1774)
Joseph Haydn  – Il ritorno di Tobia (1775)
James Hook – The Ascension, (Covent Garden, 20 March 1776)
Antonio Salieri – La passione di Gesù Cristo (1776)
John Abraham Fisher – Providence (Sheldonian Theatre, Oxford, 2 July 1777)
Thomas Linley the younger – The Song of Moses (1777)
Robert Wainwright – The Fall of Egypt (1780, Liverpool)
Marianna Martines – Sant’Elena al Calvario (1781)
Marianna Martines – Isacco figura del redentore (1782)
Wolfgang Amadeus Mozart  – Davide penitente (1785)
Antonio Rosetti – Der sterbende Jesu (1785)
Anton Teyber  – Gioas re di Giuda (1786)
Carl Ditters von Dittersdorf – Giobbe (1786)
Antonio Rosetti – Jesus in Gethsemane (1790)
Joseph Eybler – Die Hirten bei der krippe zu Bethlehem (1794)
Antonio Casimir Cartellieri – Gioas re di Giuda (1795)
Joseph Haydn – The Seven Last Words of Christ (1796)
Joseph Haydn – The Creation (1798)

19th century

Joseph Haydn  – The Seasons (1801)
Friedrich Witt  – Der leidende Heiland (1802)
Ludwig van Beethoven – Christ on the Mount of Olives (1803)
Ferdinando Paer – Il Santo Sepolcro (1803)
Antonio Casimir Cartellieri – La celebre Nativita del Redentore (1806)
Antonio Casimir Cartellieri – La purificatione di Maria Virgine (1807)
Ferdinando Paer – La Passione di Gesu Cristo (1810)
Joseph Eybler – Die vier letzten Dinge (1810)
Giacomo Meyerbeer – Gott und die Natur (1811, Berlin)
William Crotch – Palestine (1812)
Maximilian Stadler Die Befreyung von Jerusalem (1813)
George Perry – Elijah and the Priests of Baal (1818)
Friedrich Schneider – Das Weltgericht (1819)
Franz Schubert – Lazarus (composed 1820, unfinished)
Simon Mayr – Gioas (1823)
Friedrich Schneider – Verlorne Paradies (1824)
Louis Spohr – Die letzten Dinge (1826, translated as The Last Judgement 1830)
Bernhard Klein – Jephtha (1828, Cologne)
Friedrich Schneider – Pharao (1828)
 Peter Josef von Lindpaintner – Der Jüngling von Nain (1829, English version The Widow of Nain, 1850s)
Friedrich Schneider – Christus das Kind (1829)
Friedrich Schneider – Gideon (1829)
 Philip Trajetta – Jerusalem in Affliction (1828, Philadelphia)
 Philip Trajetta – Daughter of Zion (1829, Philadelphia)
Bernhard Klein – David (1830, Halle)
 William Crotch – The Captivity of Judah (1834)
Louis Spohr – Des Heilands letzte Stunden (Calvary) (1834–35)
Felix Mendelssohn – St. Paul (1836)
Friedrich Schneider – Getsemane und Golgotha (1838)
Ferdinand Hiller – Die Zerstörung Jerusalems (1840)
Louis Spohr – Der Fall Babylons (The Fall of Babylon) (1842, Norwich Festival)
Robert Schumann – Paradise and the Peri (1843)
William Jackson – The Deliverance of Israel from Babylon, (c 1845)
Hector Berlioz – La damnation de Faust (1846)
 Félicien David – Moïse au Sinaï ('Moses on Sinai') (1846)
César Franck – Ruth (1846)
Felix Mendelssohn – Elijah (1846)
 George Perry  – Hezekiah (1847)
Felix Mendelssohn – Christus (composed 1847, unfinished (premiered posthumously 1852)
 Félicien David – Eden (1848)
 William Richard Bexfield – Israel Restored (composed 1851, premiered Norwich Festival, 1852)
 William Jackson – Isaiah (1851)
Robert Schumann – Der Rose Pilgerfahrt (1851)
 Henry Hugh Pierson – Jerusalem, (1852, Norwich Festival)
Robert Schumann – Scenes from Goethe's Faust (composed 1853, premiered posthumously 1862)
Hector Berlioz – L'enfance du Christ (1854)
Charles Gounod – Tobie (1854)
Henry Leslie – Immanuel (1854)
Frederick Ouseley – St Polycarp (1854)
 Ann Mounsey Bartholomew – The Nativity, Op. 29, pastoral oratorio (1855)
 Michael Costa – Eli (1855)
Charles Gounod – Les Sept Paroles de Notre Seigneur Jésus-Christ sur la Croix (1855)
 George William Torrance – Abraham (1855)
Henry Leslie – Judith 1858)
Camille Saint-Saëns – Oratorio de Noël (1858)
 Anton Rubinstein – Paradise Lost (1859), "sacred opera")
 Henry Hiles – David (1860)
 Charles Edward Horsley – Gideon (1860, Glasgow Music Festival)
Bernhard Molique – Abraham, op. 65 (1860)
Alfred Gaul – Hezekiah(1861)
Charles Sandys Packer – Crown of Thorns (1863)
 Michael Costa – Naaman (1864)
 George William Torrance – The Captivity (1864)
 Cesar Franck – La Tour de Babel (1865)
Franz Liszt – Die Legende von der heiligen Elisabeth (1865)
 John Stainer – Gideon (1865)
 Peter Benoit – Lucifer (1866)
 Henry Hiles – The Patriarchs (1866)
 Théodore Dubois – Les Sept Paroles du Christ (1867)
 William Sterndale Bennett – The Woman of Samaria (1867, Birmingham Festival)
 Peter Benoit – De Schelde (1868)
 Henry Litolff – Ruth et Boaz (1869)
Arthur Sullivan – The Prodigal Son (1869)
 Otto Goldschmidt – Ruth (1870)
 Anton Rubinstein – The Tower of Babel (1870, "sacred opera")
 Julius Benedict – St Peter (1870, Birmingham Festival)
 William Cusins – Gideon (1871, Gloucester)
 John Knowles Paine – St Peter (1872 - "America's first oratorio")
 John Francis Barnett – The Raising of Lazarus (1873)
Franz Liszt  – Christus (1873)
George Alexander Macfarren – St John the Baptist (1873, Bristol Festival)
Jules Massenet – Marie-Magdeleine (1873)
Frederick Ouseley – Hagar (1873, Hereford Festival)
 Edouard Silas – Joash (1873, Norwich Festival)
 Henry Smart – Jacob (1873, Glasgow Festival)
Arthur Sullivan – The Light of the World (1873)
Frederick Bridge – Mount Moriah (1874)
César Franck – Rédemption (1874)
Jules Massenet – Ève (1875)
Charles Swinnerton Heap – The Captivity (1875, Birmingham Town Hall)
 Charles Villiers Stanford – The Resurrection (1875)
 George Alexander Macfarren – The Resurrection (1876, Birmingham Festival)
Camille Saint-Saëns – Le Déluge (1876)
Max Bruch – Arminius (1877)
 John Liptrot Hatton – Hezekiah (1877, Crystal Palace)
 George Alexander Macfarren – Joseph (1877, Leeds Festival)
 Philip Armes – Hezekiah (1878)
 Frederic Hymen Cowen – The Deluge, (1878, Brighton Festival)
 Théodore Dubois – Le Paradis Perdu, (1878)
 John Stainer – The Daughter of Jairus (1878)
César Franck  – Les Béatitudes (composed 1879, premiered posthumously 1893)
Arthur Sullivan – The Martyr of Antioch (1880)
Jules Massenet – La Vierge (1880)
Philip Armes – St. John the Evangelist (1881)
Charles Gounod – La rédemption (1882)
 George William Torrance – The Revelation (1882, Melbourne)
Joseph Barnby – Rebekah (1883)
 George Alexander Macfarren – King David (1883, Leeds Festival)
John Stainer – Mary Magdalen (1883)
Alexander Mackenzie – The Rose of Sharon (1884, Norwich Festival)
Charles Gounod – Mors et vita (1885)
Dudley Buck – The Light of Asia (composed 1886 (premiered 1887)
Antonín Dvořák – Saint Ludmila (1886, Leeds Festival)
 W. S. Rockstro – The Good Shepherd (1886, Three Choirs Festival)
Marie Emmanuel Augustin Savard – La Vision de Saül (1886)
 Charles Villiers Stanford – The Three Holy Children (1886, Birmingham Festival)
 Giovanni Bottesini – The Garden of Olivet (1887, Norwich Festival)
 Frederic Hymen Cowen – Ruth (1887, Three Choirs Festival)
 Luigi Mancinelli – Isaias (1887, Norwich Festival)
John Stainer – The Crucifixion (1887)
 Hubert Parry – Judith (1888, Birmingham Festival)
William Spark – Immanuel (1889)
Frederick Bridge – The Repentance of Nineveh (1890, Worcester Festival)
 Edgar Tinel – St Francis (1890)
Philip Armes – St Barnabas (1891, Durham Cathedral)
Charles Gounod – Saint Francois d'Assise (1891)
 Charles Villiers Stanford – Eden (1891, dramatic oratorio)
Alexander Mackenzie – Bethlehem (1892)
Hubert Parry – Job (1892, Gloucester Festival)
Horatio Parker – Hora Novissima (1893)
 Heinrich von Herzogenberg – Die Geburt Christi, op. 90 (1894)
Hubert Parry – King Saul (1894, Birmingham Festival)
Edward Elgar – The Light of Life (Lux Christi) (1896)
Willard Patton (1853–1924) – Isaiah (1897)
Lorenzo Perosi – La Passione di Cristo (1897)
Henry Walford Davies – Days of Man (1897)
Lorenzo Perosi – La Trasfigurazione di Cristo (1898)
Lorenzo Perosi – La Risurrezione di Lazzaro (1898)
Lorenzo Perosi – La Risurrezione di Cristo (1898)
Lorenzo Perosi – Il Natale del Redentore (1899)
Felix Draeseke – Christus. Mysterium in a Prelude and Three Oratorios (1899)
 Frederic Hymen Cowen – Jephthah (1900, unfinished)
Horatio-Parker – A Wanderer's Psalm (1900, Hereford Festival)
Lorenzo Perosi – L'entrata di Cristo in Gerusalemme (1900)
Lorenzo Perosi – La Strage degli Innocenti (1900)
Lorenzo Perosi – Mosè (1900)
Jules Massenet – La Terre Promise (1900)
Edward Elgar – The Dream of Gerontius (1900)

20th century
 

Horatio Parker – Legend of St Christopher (1902, Worcester Festival)
Henry Walford Davies – The Temple, (1902, Worcester Festival)
Edward Elgar  – The Apostles (1903)
Samuel Coleridge-Taylor – The Atonement (1903, Hereford Festival)
Lorenzo Perosi – Stabat Mater (1904)
Lorenzo Perosi – Il Giudizio Universale (1904)
Lorenzo Perosi – Dies Iste (1904)
 Henry Walford Davies – Everyman (1904)
Edward Elgar – The Kingdom (1906)
David Evans – Llawenhewch yn yr Iôr (1906, Caernarfon Festival) 
Lorenzo Perosi – Transitus Animae (1907)
Granville Bantock – Christ in the Wilderness (1907, Gloucester Festival)
Gabriel Pierné – Les enfants à Bethléem (1907)
Lorenzo Perosi – In Patris Memoriam (1909)
 Granville Bantock – Gethsemane (1910, Gloucester Festival)
Lorenzo Perosi – Vespertina Oratio (1912)
Lorenzo Perosi – Le Sette Parole di Nostro Signore Gesu' Cristo sulla Croce (1913)
Lorenzo Perosi – La Samaritana (1913)
Camille Saint-Saëns – The Promised Land (1913)
Lorenzo Perosi – In Diebus Tribolationis (1916)
Erik Satie – Socrate (1920)
Arthur Honegger – Le roi David (1921)
Arnold Schoenberg – Die Jakobsleiter (composed 1922, revised 1944, unfinished)
Hermann Suter – Le Laudi (1924)
Ralph Vaughan Williams – Sancta Civitas (The Holy City) (1926)
Lucien Haudebert – Dieu vainqueur (1927, Mannheim)
Igor Stravinsky  –  Oedipus rex (1927)
Lorenzo Perosi – Il Sogno Interpretato (1928)
 Robin Milford – A Prophet in the Land (1929, Three Choirs Festival 1931)
 Johanna Müller-Hermann – Lied der Erinnerung: In Memoriam (1930)
Lorenzo Perosi – In Fratris Memoriam: (1930)
 George Dyson – The Canterbury Pilgrims (1931)
Paul Hindemith – Das Unaufhörliche (1931)
Paul Ben-Haim – Joram (1931-33)
Arthur Honegger – Jeanne d'Arc au bûcher (1935)
William Alwyn – The Marriage of Heaven and Hell (1936, fp. 18 February 2023, Kings College London Chapel)
Lennox Berkeley – Jonah 1936, Leeds Festival (1937)
Robert Nathaniel Dett – The Ordering of Moses (1937, revived 2014, Cincinnati)
Lorenzo Perosi – In Transitu Sancti Patris Nostri Francisci (1937)
Lorenzo Perosi – Natalitia (1937)
Herbert Howells  – Hymnus Paradisi (composed 1936-38, premiered 1950)
Franz Schmidt  – The Book with Seven Seals (1938)
Ahmed Adnan Saygun – Yunus Emre (1942)
Frank Martin – Le vin herbé (1942)
Martin Shaw – The Redeemer (1944)
Michael Tippett  – A Child of Our Time (1944)
William Wordsworth – Dies Domini (1944)
Frank Martin – In terra pax (1945)
William Lloyd Webber – St. Francis of Assisi (1948)
Frank Martin – Golgotha (1949)
Dmitri Shostakovich – Song of the Forests (1949)
Ernst Hermann Meyer – Mansfeld Oratorio (1950)
Lorenzo Perosi – Il Nazareno (1950)
Sergei Prokofiev – On Guard for Peace (1950)
Heitor Villa-Lobos – Symphony No. 10, Sumé pater patrium: Sinfonia ameríndia com coros (Oratorio) (1952–53)
Léo Ferré – La Chanson du mal-aimé (1954, revised 1972)
Hans Vogt – Die Stadt hinter dem Strom (opera-oratorio) (1955)
Vadim Salmanov – The Twelve (1957)
Bohuslav Martinů – The Epic of Gilgamesh (1958)
Alfred Schnittke – Nagasaki (1958)
Frank Martin – Le Mystère de la Nativité (1960)
Daniel Jones – St Peter (1962)
Raymond Warren – The Passion (1962)
Mordecai Seter – Midnight Vigil (1963, revised 1984)
Federico Mompou – Los Improperios (1964, expanded 1966-8)
Mikis Theodorakis-  Axion Esti (1964)
Krzysztof Penderecki – St Luke Passion (1966)
Hans Werner Henze  – Das Floß der Medusa (1968)
Raymond Warren – Songs of Unity (1968)
Mikis Theodorakis –  The March of the Spirit (1969)
James Furman – I Have a Dream (1970)
 George Newson – Arena, a 'staged oratorio', (fp Roundhouse, 6 September 1971)
Dmitry Kabalevsky – A Letter to the 30th Century, Op. 93, (1972)
Darius Milhaud – Saint-Louis, roi de France (1972)
Mikis Theodorakis – Canto General (1972)
 Patric Standford – Christus Requiem (1973)
Michael Hurd – Hip Hip Horatio (1975)
Howard Blake – Benedictus (Song of Zechariah) (1980)
Undine Smith Moore  – Scenes from the Life of a Martyr (1981, Pulitzer Prize nominated)
Charles Wuorinen  – The Celestial Sphere (1981)
 Olle Elgenmark – Ordet vart kött (The Word was made Flesh) (1982)
Mauricio Kagel – Sankt-Bach-Passion (1985)
Peter Schickele – Oedipus Tex (composed 1985, premiered 1986)
Ronald Senator – Holocaust Requiem (1986, Canterbury)
Somei Satoh – Stabat Mater (1987)
Colin Touchin – Hilarion (1987)
Raymond Warren – Continuing Cities (1989)
Naji Hakim – Saul de Tarse (1991)
Paul McCartney – Liverpool Oratorio (1991)
Richard Shephard – There Was Such Beauty (1991, Gloucester Cathedral)
Mikis Theodorakis- Canto Olympico (1991)
René Clemencic – Kabbala (1992)
 Geoffrey Poole – Blackbird (1993)
Mona Lyn Reese  – Choose Life, Uvacharta Bachayim (1994)
Richard Einhorn – Voices of Light (1994)
Kay Gardner –  Ouroboros: Seasons of Life (1994)
Bob Farrell and Greg Nelson – Saviour (1994)
Elliot Goldenthal – Fire Water Paper: A Vietnam Oratorio (1995)
Samuel Jones – The Temptation of Jesus (Text, Holy Scriptures/Thomas Merton) (1995)
Antonio Braga – San Domenico di Guzman (1997)
Matthew King – Gethsemane (1998)
Raymond Warren – St. John Passion (Were You There?), passion setting with spirituals (1999)
John Adams – El Niño (2000)
 Steve Elcock – Spei Cantus, op.9 (2000)
Osvaldo Golijov – 'La Pasión según San Marcos (2000)
Paul Spicer – Easter Oratorio (2000)

21st century

 Jacob ter Veldhuis – Paradiso Oratorio (2001)
Anthony Davis – Restless Mourning (2002), commemorating the 9/11 attacks
Nathan Currier – Gaian Variations (2004)
Piotr Rubik – Oratorium Świętokrzyska Golgota (2004)
Sally Lutyens – First Light: An Oratorio (2005)
Ilaiyaraaja  – Thiruvasakam (2005)
Piotr Rubik – Tu Es Petrus (2005)
Julian Anderson – Heaven is Shy of Earth (2006, BBC Proms)
Howard Blake – The Passion of Mary (2006)
Paul McCartney – Ecce Cor Meum (2006)
Piotr Rubik – Oratorium Psałterz Wrześniowy (2006)
Kaija Saariaho – La Passion de Simone (2006)
Eric Idle and John Du Prez – Not the Messiah (He's a Very Naughty Boy) (2007)
Ted Hearne – Katrina Ballads (2007)
Paul Moravec – The Blizzard Voices (2008)
Antony Pitts – Jerusalem-Yerushalayim (2008)
Steven Stucky and Gene Scheer – 4 August 1964 (2008)
Jonathan Dove – There was a child (2009)
Richard Einhorn – The Origin (2009)
Paul Spicer – Advent Oratorio (2009)
Donald Reid Womack – Voices of Kalaupapa (2009)
 Kitty Brazelton – Ecclesiastes: A Modern Oratorio (2010)
Rob Gardner – Lamb of God (2010)
Dinesh Subasinghe – Karuna Nadee (2010)
Jonathan Harvey (composer), Hans Küng (libretto) – Weltethos; (premiered 2011)
John Adams – The Gospel According to the Other Mary (2012)
Colin Touchin – Choose the Light (2012, Coventry Mysteries Festival)
Philip Wilby – The Holy Face (2013, first performance 2017)
Neil Hannon – To our Fathers' in Distress (2014)
Ted Hearne – The Source (2014)
Julia Wolfe – Anthracite Fields (2014)
Jóhann Jóhannsson – Drone Mass (2015, "a contemporary oratorio")
Nico Muhly – Sentences (2015)
Mark Simpson - The Immortal (Bridgewater Hall, Manchester, 2015)
Jonathan Dove – A Brief History of Creation (2016)
Craig Hella Johnson – Considering Matthew Shepard (2016)
Peter Reulein and Helmut Schlegel – Laudato si' (2016)
Anthony Ritchie – Gallipoli to the Somme (2016)
Thomas Gabriel – Bruder Martin (2017)
Jörg Widmann – Arche (2017)
Paul Moravec – Sanctuary Road (2018)
Roxanna Panufnik – Faithful Journey, a Mass for Poland (2018, fp. Katowice, 9/11/18)
Philip Sawyers – Mayflower on the Sea of Time (2018)
Julia Wolfe – Fire in my mouth (2018)
Bob Chilcott – Christmas Oratorio (Three Choirs Festival, 2019)
 Simon Franglen – The Birth of Skies and Earth (2019)
 Wadada Leo Smith – Rosa Parks: Pure Love. An Oratorio of Seven Songs (2019)
 Karin Rehnqvist – Silent Earth (2020, fp. 29 January 2022, Amsterdam)
James MacMillan – A Christmas Oratorio (2021)
Peter Reulein and Bernhard Kießig – Eins (2021)
 Luke Styles – Voices of Power (Three Choirs Festival, fp 28 July 2022)
 Kate Whitley – Our Future In Your Hands (Buxton Festival, fp 10 July 2022)

See alsoLa passione di Gesù Cristo for a list of composers who have set oratorios to this libretto by Metastasio, originally written in 1730Betulia liberata for a list of composers who have set oratorios to this libretto by Metastasio, originally written in 1734Der Tod Jesu for a list of composers who have set oratorios to this libretto by Karl Wilhelm Ramler, originally written in 1755La Giuditta'' for a list of composers who have written oratorios based on the Book of Judith
 List of oratorios at IMSLP

References 

Oratorios
Choral compositions